Joan Busquets i Grau (born 26 July 1946 in El Prat de Llobregat) is a Spanish architect, urban planner, and educator. Busquets is the Martin Bucksbaum Professor in Practice of Urban Planning and Design at the Harvard University Graduate School of Design. He is founder of the architecture firm, BAU Barcelona. Busquets was awarded the 2011 Erasmus Prize, an annual award for exceptional contributions to European culture and society, "...in appreciation of his impressive and multifaceted oeuvre in the field of city planning."

Career
Born in El Prat de Llobregat, a suburb of Barcelona, Busquets graduated from the Polytechnic University of Catalonia in 1969. He was Professor of Town Planning at the Polytechnic University of Catalonia from 1979 until 2002. Since 2002, he is the first Martin Bucksbaum Professor in Practice of Urban Planning and Design at the Harvard University Graduate School of Design. He was a visiting professor at Harvard from 1989-1993 and in 1997.

Busquets headed the Planning Department of the Municipality of Barcelona from 1983 to 1989 and during the preparations for the 1992 Summer Olympics there.

Awards

 Erasmus Prize (2011)
 Old seal of City of Trento, 2008
 The Catedra Lluis Barragán, TECM. Guadalajara Mexico, 2007
 ICSS Price for building the Chiado in Lisbon, 2001
 Premio Gubbio, European Prize, 2000
 National Award 1996 for the redevelopment plan for Toledo, 1996
 Spanish National Planning Award for a masterplan for Lerida, 1985
 Spanish National Planning Award for urban design for Sant Josep, Barcelona, 1981

Works
 Toulouse City Center, Toulouse, France (2012-2017)
 A Coruña Masterplan, A Coruña, Spain (2008)
 Helmond City Center, Helmond, Netherlands (2005)
 Grotiusplaats, The Hague, Netherlands (1992–2005)
 Forum Viseu, Viseu, Portugal (2003–2005)
 Nesselande Community Center, Nesselande, Netherlands (2002)
 Maquinista Housing Complex, Barcelona, Spain (1998-2002)

Bibliography
Barcelona: Evolución urbanística de una ciudad compacta, 1992, 
Barcelona, 1994, 
La urbanización marginal, 1999, 
Ciutat Vella de Barcelona: Un passat amb futur, 2004,

References

External links
 BAU Barcelona official site

1946 births
Living people
People from El Prat de Llobregat
Polytechnic University of Catalonia alumni
Architects from Catalonia
Urban planners from Catalonia
Academic staff of the Polytechnic University of Catalonia
Harvard Graduate School of Design faculty
Members of the Académie d'architecture